The Curtiss-Bleecker Helicopter was an American prototype rotary wing aircraft, introduced in 1926. The thrust of the aircraft was distributed from a central mounted engine through shafts to propellers mounted on each rotor blade.

Design and development
The Bleecker Helicopter was designed by Maitland B. Bleecker, a junior engineer from the National Advisory Committee for Aeronautics. The aircraft was constructed by Curtiss Wright for $250,000 over the course of four years at Garden City.

The aircraft featured a rotary wing design with a single engine. Each rotor, painted silver and yellow, had an individual propeller for thrust and a trailing control surface called a "stabovator" to change pitch of the rotor. The aircraft was controlled by a stick that operated like a modern helicopter collective control. Yaw was controlled with a "Spin Vane" that used downwash from the rotor to pivot the aircraft with foot pedals.

Operational history
Testing on the Bleecker Helicopter was stopped after the failure of a drive shaft on a test flight in 1929. By 1933 the project was abandoned following vibrational issues in further tests.

Specifications

See also

References

External links

1920s United States helicopters
Aircraft first flown in 1926
Single-engined piston helicopters
Curtiss aircraft